Glandonia is a genus in the Malpighiaceae, a family of about 75 genera of flowering plants in the order Malpighiales. Glandonia comprises 3 species of trees or shrubs native to lowland forests along rivers or in areas periodically flooded in Amazonian Colombia, Venezuela, and Brazil.

External links
Malpighiaceae Malpighiaceae - description, taxonomy, phylogeny, and nomenclature
Glandonia

Malpighiaceae
Malpighiaceae genera